Kinsey is an unincorporated community located in the central part of Jackson Township in Sainte Genevieve County, Missouri, United States. The town was named after William Metcalfe Kinsey, a congressman of St. Louis. Kinsey was born in Ohio, and came to Missouri in 1875, where he was elected congressman for the 10th district and became a leading Republican politician in the state.

References 

Unincorporated communities in Ste. Genevieve County, Missouri
Unincorporated communities in Missouri